Pontia edusa, the eastern Bath white, is a butterfly in the family Pieridae.

Description

Pontia edusa is a small to medium-sized migrant butterfly, with a wingspan reaching about 45 mm. The upperside of the wings is white, with black stains on the top of the forewing and hindwing. The hindwing undersides have greenish-grey spots. The butterfly is nearly identical to Pontia daplidice. Investigations of the genitals are the only way to distinguish between these two types.

The adults fly from March to October with two to four generations depending on the latitude. The eggs are laid singly and have an incubation period of seven days. The caterpillars are present from May. They are greyish-greenish, with black dots and broad yellow stripes, quite similar to the larva of the cabbage butterfly (Pieris brassicae). The larvae feed on Resedaceae species. Pontia edusa hibernates in the chrysalis stage.

Distribution
It is found from the south east of Europe (southern France, Italy, Corsica, Sardinia) up to central Europe and the Middle East in Iran and Iraq. It is a migrant which can also be encountered in Belgium, Holland, northern Germany and Poland, in the Baltic states and in southern Sweden and Norway.

Habitat

Subspecies
 P. e. edusa (Fabricius, 1777) (Finland and north east and south east Central Europe, Italy, Turkey, the Caucasus, Ukraine, Russia)
 P. e. persica (Bienert, 1869) (Iran, Afghanistan)
 P. e. nubicola (Fruhstorfer, 1908) (Turkestan)
 P. e. amphimara (Fruhstorfer, 1908) (China (Szetschwan), Yunnan)
 P. e. praeclara Fruhstorfer, 1910 (south west China)
 P. e. moorei (Röber, 1907) (Kashmir, Baluchistan, Tibet, Yunnan, south east China, Thailand)
 P. e. avidia (Fruhstorfer, 1908) (southern China, ? Korea)
 P. e. davendra Hemming, 1934 (Siberia (Ussuri))

References

 M.Chinery et P.Leraut Photoguide des papillons d'Europe Delachaux et Niestlé
 Guide des papillons d'Europe et d'Afrique du Nord de Tom Tolman, Richard Lewington, éditions Delachaux et Niestlé, 1998

External links
 Moths and butterflies in Europe and North Africa
 Video
 Lepiforum.de

edusa
Butterflies of Asia
Butterflies of Europe
Butterflies of Indochina
Fauna of Western Asia
Butterflies described in 1777